The 1951–52 Bulgarian Hockey League season was the first season of the Bulgarian Hockey League, the top level of ice hockey in Bulgaria. Five teams participated in the league, and Cerveno Zname Sofia won the championship.

Regular season

Final 
 Cerveno Zname Sofia - Udarnik Sofia 1:0

External links
 Season on hockeyarchives.info

Bul
Bulgarian Hockey League seasons
1951–52 in Bulgarian ice hockey